Malesherbia tubulosa is subshrub native to central Peru. It is colloquially called Mullaca and Verónica. M. tubulosa can reach heights of 2 meters and has actinomorphic orange flowers.

Compared to other species of Malesherbia, M. tubulosa has relatively high genetic diversity. It is a host for immature Dione (Agraulis) dodona. 

M. tubulosa is currently classified as endangered due to degradation of natural habitat due to urban expansion.

References 

tubulosa
Plants described in 1805
Flora of Peru